Chenaqchi is a village in East Azerbaijan Province, Iran

Chenaqchi or Chanaqchi or Chonaqchi, also rendered as Chunaqcheh and Janaqchi, may also refer to:
 Chenaqchi-ye Olya, Markazi Province
 Chenaqchi-ye Sofla, Markazi Province